Clémence Lortet (17 September 1772 – 15 April 1835) was a French botanist and naturalist. In 1823 she became an associate of the Linnean Society of Paris, and with Giovanni Balbis and others, co-founded the Linnean Society of Lyon.  She is grandmother of Louis Lortet (1836-1909).  A branch of the Bibliothèque municipale de Lyon was named for Lortet. Although she did not publish any contributions in her lifetime, several of her manuscripts are published.

References

19th-century French botanists
19th-century French women scientists
French naturalists
1772 births
1835 deaths